Inborn errors of metabolism form a large class of genetic diseases involving congenital disorders of enzyme activities. The majority are due to defects of single genes that code for enzymes that facilitate conversion of various substances (substrates) into others (products). In most of the disorders, problems arise due to accumulation of substances which are toxic or interfere with normal function, or due to the effects of reduced ability to synthesize essential compounds. Inborn errors of metabolism are now often referred to as congenital metabolic diseases or inherited metabolic disorders. To this concept it's possible to include the new term of Enzymopathy. This term was created following the study of Biodynamic Enzymology, a science based on the study of the enzymes and their derivated products. Finally, inborn errors of metabolism were studied for the first time by British physician Archibald Garrod (1857–1936), in 1908. He is known for work that prefigured the "one gene-one enzyme" hypothesis, based on his studies on the nature and inheritance of alkaptonuria. His seminal text, Inborn Errors of Metabolism, was published in 1923.

Classification and symptoms of metabolic diseases 

Traditionally the inherited metabolic diseases were classified as disorders of carbohydrate metabolism, amino acid metabolism, organic acid metabolism, or lysosomal storage diseases. In recent decades, hundreds of new inherited disorders of metabolism have been discovered and the categories have proliferated. Following are some of the major classes of congenital metabolic diseases, with prominent examples of each class. 

Because of the enormous number of these diseases the wide range of systems affected badly, nearly every "presenting complaint" to a healthcare provider may have a congenital metabolic disease as a possible cause, especially in childhood and adolescence. The following are examples of potential manifestations affecting each of the major organ systems.

Diagnostic
Dozens of congenital metabolic diseases are now detectable by newborn screening tests, especially expanded testing using mass spectrometry. gas chromatography–mass spectrometry-based technology with an integrated analytics system, which has now made it possible to test a newborn for over 100 mm genetic metabolic disorders. Because of the multiplicity of conditions, many different diagnostic tests are used for screening. An abnormal result is often followed by a subsequent "definitive test" to confirm the suspected diagnosis.

Common screening tests used in the last sixty years:
Ferric chloride test (detects abnormal metabolites in urine)
Ninhydrin paper chromatography (detects abnormal amino acid patterns)
Guthrie test (detects excessive amounts of specific amino acids in blood) The dried blood spot can be used for multianalyte testing using Tandem Mass Spectrometry (MS/MS). This given an indication for a disorder. The same has to be further confirmed by enzyme assays, IEX-Ninhydrin, GC/MS or DNA Testing.
Quantitative measurement of amino acids in plasma and urine
 IEX-Ninhydrin post-column derivitization liquid ion chromatography (detects abnormal amino acid patterns and quantitative analysis)
Urine organic acid analysis by gas chromatography–mass spectrometry
Plasma acylcarnitine analysis by mass spectrometry
Urine purine and pyrimidine analysis by gas chromatography-mass spectrometry

Specific diagnostic tests (or focused screening for a small set of disorders):
Tissue biopsy: liver, muscle, brain, bone marrow
Skin biopsy and fibroblast cultivation for specific enzyme testing
Specific DNA testing

A 2015 review reported that even with all these diagnostic tests, there are cases when "biochemical testing, gene sequencing, and enzymatic testing can neither confirm nor rule out an IEM, resulting in the need to rely on the patient's clinical course". A 2021 review showed that several neurometabolic disorders converge on common neurochemical mechanisms that interfere with biological mechanisms also considered central in ADHD pathophysiology and treatment. This highlights the importance of close collaboration between health services to avoid clinical overshadowing.

Treatment
In the middle of the 20th century the principal treatment for some of the amino acid disorders was restriction of dietary protein and all other care was simply management of complications. In the past twenty years, new medications, enzyme replacement, gene therapy, and organ transplantation have become available and beneficial for many previously untreatable disorders. Some of the more common or promising therapies are listed:

Epidemiology
In a study in British Columbia, the overall incidence of the inborn errors of metabolism were estimated to be 40 per 100,000 live births or 1 in 2,500 births, overall representing more than approximately 15% of single gene disorders in the population. While a Mexican study established an overall incidence of 3.4: 1000 live newborns and a carrier detection of 6.8:1000 NBS.

References

Further reading

External links 

Portal of Chemistry (Italian)

 
Medical genetics
Metabolism